Listed below are Maghrebis of note.

Modern

Actors

Architects

Artists

Musicians

 Faouzia Ouihya – Moroccan-Canadian singer-songwriter, born in Casablanca

Philosophers

Politicians

Royalty

Sportspersons

Writers

Other notables

Ancient
 Shoshenq I, Egyptian Pharaoh of Libyan origin, founder of the Twenty-second dynasty of Egypt.
 Tefnakht, Pharaoh of Libyan origin, who reigned 732–725 BC
 Masinissa, King of Numidia, North Africa, present day Algeria and Tunisia
 Jugurtha, King of Numidia
 Juba II, King of Numidia
 Macrinus, Roman emperor for 14 months in 217 and 218
 Lusius Quietus, governor of Judaea under the emperor Trajan
 Quintus Lollius Urbicus, governor of Britannia from 138 to 144
Terence, (Publius Terentius Afer), Roman writer
Apuleius, Roman writer ("half-Numidian, half-Gaetulian")<ref name=Americana>"Berbers : [...] The best known of them were the Roman author Apuleius, the Roman emperor Septimius Severus, and Augustine of Hippo, whose mother was a berber", Encyclopedia Americana, Scholastic Library Publishing, 2005, v.3, p. 569</ref>
Marcus Cornelius Fronto, Roman grammarian, rhetorician and advocate, was born at Cirta in modern Algeria
Tertullian, an early Christian theologian (born in the highly multiethnic, Phoenician-founded city of Carthage)
Saint Monica of Hippo, Saint Augustine's mother
Arius, who proposed the doctrine of Arianism
Donatus Magnus, leader of the Donatist schism
Gelasius I between 492 and 496
Victor I between 186 and 201
Miltiades between 311 and 314
Tacfarinas, who fought the Romans in the Aures Mountains,
Firmus, who fought the Romans Between 372 and 375
Gildo, who fought the Romans in 398
 Abd ar-Rahman I (731–788), his mother was a Berber.
 Al-Mansur (712–775), his mother was a Berber. Generally regarded as the real founder of the Abbasid Caliphate, his descendants Al-Mahdi, Harun al-Rashid etc. were therefore also partially Berber.
Tariq ibn Ziyad, one of the leaders of the Moorish conquest of Iberia in 711.
Adrian of Canterbury, Abbot of St Augustine's Abbey in Canterbury
Dihya or al-Kahina
Aksil or Kusayla
Salih ibn Tarif of the Berghouata
Abbas Ibn Firnas, inventor and aviator who made the first attempt at controlled flight
Ibn Tumart, founder of the Almohad dynasty
Yusuf ibn Tashfin, founder of the Almoravid dynasty
 Ibn Battuta (1304–1377), Moroccan traveller and explorer
Abu Yaqub Yusuf I, who had the Giralda in Seville built.
Abu Yaqub Yusuf II, who had the Torre del Oro in Seville built.
Ziri ibn Manad founder of the Zirid dynasty
Muhammad Awzal (ca. 1680–1749), prolific Sous Berber poet (see also Ocean of Tears)
 Muhammad al-Jazuli, author of the Dala'il al-Khairat, Sufi
 Abu Ali al-Hassan al-Yusi
 Imam al-Busiri, poet and author of the famous poem Qasida Burda – lived in Alexandria

People of mixed Maghrebi and European ancestry
Modern
Cédric Ben Abdallah (Ben) – French humorist, Algerian father and French mother
Yasmine golotchoglova – French youtubeuse, Russian father and algérian mother
Robert Abdesselam – French politician and tennis player, Algerian father and French mother
Ramzi Abid – Canadian professional ice hockey player, Tunisian father and Scottish mother
Karima Adebibe – English model and actress, Moroccan father and Greek-Irish mother
Damien Saez – French musicien, Spanish father and algérian mother
Fu'ad Aït Aattou – French Actor, Moroccan Berber father and French mother
Isabelle Adjani – French actress, Algerian father and German mother
Alejandro Agag – Spanish businessman and former politician, Algerian father and Spanish mother
Laurent Agouazi – Soccer player, Algerian father and French mother
Natacha Amal – Belgian Actress, Moroccan father and Russian mother
Amina Allam – Moroccan model, Moroccan father and Finnish mother
Aure Atika – French actress, French father and Moroccan mother
Malika Ayane – Italian singer, Moroccan father and Italian mother
Malika zouhali–worrall – English documentary filmmaker, English father and Moroccan mother
Jordan Bardella – French politician, President of the National Rally (previously the National Front) since September 2021 (Acting), Algerian great-grandfather
Samir Barris – Belgian singer, Algerian father and Flemish Belgian mother
Alain Bashung – French singer, songwriter and actor, Algerian father and French mother
 Kader Belarbi – French choreographer, Algerian father and French mother
Mehdi Belhaj Kacem  – French-Tunisian actor, philosopher, and writer, Tunisia father and French mother
Catherine Belkhodja – French artist, actress and film director. Algerian father and a French mother
Jeanne Benameur – French writer, Tunisian father and Italian mother
Djemila Benhabib – Canadian opponent of Muslim fundamentalism, Algerian father and Cypriot mother
 Malik Bendjelloul – was a Swedish documentary filmmaker, journalist and former child actor. He directed the 2012 documentary Searching for Sugar Man'', which won an Academy Award and a BAFTA Award, Algerian father and Swedish mother
Farouk Bermouga – French actor, Algerian father and French mother
Big flo et oli – French band, Argentine father and Algerian mother
Dany Boon – French actor, Algerian father and French mother. Best-paid actor in European film history
Assaad Bouab – Moroccan actor, Moroccan father and French mother.
Tarik O'Regan – English musician, Irish father and Algerian mother
Ali Boulala – Swedish professional skateboarder, Algerian father and Swedish mother
Josef Boumedienne – Swedish professional hockey defenceman, Algerian father and Finnish mother
Nina Bouraoui – French writer, Algerian father and French mother
Daniel Brückner – Soccer player, Algerian father and German mother
Bushido – German Rapper, Tunisian father and German mother
Mehdi Carcela-González – Moroccan Soccer player, Spanish father and Moroccan mother
Samir Carruthers – English Soccer player, Irish-Italian father and Moroccan mother
Nicolas Cazalé – French actor, French father and Algerian mother
Liassine cadamuro – French footballer, Italian father and Algerian mother
Sara Chafak – Finnish beauty pageant titleholder, Moroccan father and Finnish mother
Manuel da Costa – Soccer player, Portuguese father and Moroccan mother
Gérald Darmanin – Minister of the Interior since 2020, Algerian grandfather
Jean-Baptiste Djebbari – Minister for Transport, Algerian great grandfather
Sofia Essaidi – Moroccan French singer, Moroccan father and French mother
Michaël Fabre – French Soccer player, Algerian father and French mother
Adrien Gallo – French musician and actor, French father and Algerian mother
Julien Gerbi – French race car driver, Algerian father and French mother
Mehdi El Glaoui – French actor, Moroccan father and French mother
Brice Guilbert – French singer, French father and Moroccan mother
Touriya Haoud – Dutch actress, Moroccan father and Macedonian mother
Karim Hendou – Algerian Soccer player, Algerian father and Ukrainian mother
Hédi Kaddour – French writer, Tunisian father and French mother
Hakim El Karoui – French politician, Tunisian father and French mother
Saïd El Khadraoui – Belgian politician, Moroccan father and Flemish Belgian mother
Sami Khedira – German football player, Tunisian father and German mother
Rani Khedira – German football player, Tunisian father and German mother
Jonas Hassen Khemiri – Swedish novelist, Tunisian father and Swedish mother
Marina Kaye – French singer, French father and Algerian mother
Reem Kherici – French actress, Tunisian father and Italian mother
Myriam El Khomri – current French Minister of Labour (2016), Moroccan father and French mother
Taïg Khris – French inline skater, Algerian father and Greek mother
Simone Lahbib – Scottish actress, Algerian father and Scottish mother
Mehdi Lacen – French Soccer player, Algerian father and Italian mother
Hind Laroussi Tahiri – Dutch singer, Moroccan father and Dutch mother
Maïwenn Le Besco and Isild Le Besco – French actress, Algerian grandfather
Amine Lecomte – Soccer player, French father and Moroccan mother
Jalil Lespert – French actor, French father and Algerian mother
Sheryfa Luna – French singer, Algerian father and French mother
Ali Magoudi – French psychoanalyst and writer, Algerian father and Polish mother   
Yannis Marshall – French dancer, English father and Algerian mother
Florian Makhedjouf – Soccer player, Algerian father and Italian mother
Elyas M’Barek – German Actor, Tunisian father and German mother
Carl Medjani – French Soccer player, Algerian father and French mother
Mourad Meghni – French footballer, Algerian father and Portuguese mother
Kad Merad – French actor, Algerian father and French mother
Maxime Mermoz – French Rugby player, French father and Algerian mother
MC Rene – German rapper, Moroccan father and German mother
Arnaud Montebourg – French politician, Algerian grandfather, France's Minister of Industrial Renewal
Mehdi Mostefa – French Soccer player, Algerian father and French mother
Marcel Mouloudji – French singer and actor, Algerian father and French mother
Cyril Mourali – French actor, Tunisian father and French mother
Chazia Mourali – Dutch TV presenter, Tunisian father and Dutch mother
Kerim Mrabti – Swedish Soccer player, Tunisian father and Swedish-Finnish mother
Lee Lamrani Ibrahim "Lightning" Murray – British-Moroccan cage fighter turned gangster, Moroccan father and English mother
Samy Naceri – French actor, Algerian father and French mother
 Mehdi Nebbou – French actor, Algerian father and German mother
Marie-José Nat – French actress, Algerian father and French mother
Malika Nedir – Swiss TV presenter, Algerian father and Swiss mother
Juliette Noureddine – French singer, Algerian grandfather
Laurette Onkelinx – Belgian politician, Belgian father and Algerian mother
Artur Partyka – Polish high jumper, Algerian father and Polish mother
Pnl – French band, Corsica father and Algerian mother
Édith Piaf – French singer, Moroccan great-grandfather
Jérome Polenz – Soccer player, Algerian father and German mother
Daniel Prévost – French comedian, Algerian father and French mother
Karim Rekik –  Dutch football player, Tunisian father and Dutch mother
Damien Saez – French singer, Spanish father and Algerian mother
Leila Sebbar – French writer, Algerian father and French mother
Adam Sioui – Canadian college and international swimmer, Algerian father and Canadian mother
Myriam Sif – Moroccan singer, Moroccan father and Hungarian mother
 Hedi Slimane – French fashion designer, Tunisian father and Italian mother
Benjamin Stambouli – Soccer player, Algerian father and French mother
Jacques Villeret – French actor, Algerian father and French mother
Najat Vallaud-Belkacem – first French woman to be appointed Minister of Education, Higher Education, and Research on 25 August 2014, Moroccan father and Spanish grandmother
Karim Ziani – French footballer, Algerian Algerian father and French mother
 Enzo Zidane (1995-), Luca Zidane (1998-), Elyaz Zidane (2005-) - Soccer players, Algerian father
Malik Zidi – French actor, Algerian father and French mother
Kenza Zouiten – Swedish fashion blogger, Moroccan father and Swedish mother
Aladdin Meier – Swiss radio presenter, Swiss Father and Moroccan Mother
Maxime Mermoz- French father and algérian mother

Ancient
Septimius Severus, Roman Emperor who reigned from 14 April 193 until his death in 211
 Augustine of Hippo, Latin Church Father, one of the most important figures in the development of Western Christianity
 Abd-ar-Rahman III, Emir and Caliph of Córdoba (912–961) of the Umayyad dynasty in al-Andalus

People of mixed Maghrebi and Asian ancestry
Erika Sawajiri – Japan-based actress, model, and musician. Japanese father and an Algerian Berber mother
Maïwenn Le Besco and Isild Le Besco –  French actress, Algerian grandfather, Vietnamese grandfather

See also
 Maghrebis

Notes

Maghrebi